Anne Marsh Caldwell (August 30, 1867 – October 22, 1936), also known as Anne Caldwell O'Dea, was an American playwright and lyricist. She wrote both pop songs and Broadway shows, sometimes working with composer Jerome Kern.

Biography 
Anne Marsh Caldwell was born in Boston, Massachusetts. She began her career at the Juvenile Opera Co. as one of only four female songwriters active in the early 1900s. She was a charter member of the American Society of Composers, Authors and Publishers, where her output between 1907 through 1928 focused mainly on Broadway scores. 

In 1929, lured by producer William LeBaron, she went to Hollywood where she became a script doctor and write lyrics for RKO Pictures. It was announced that she was engaged by Max Hart to write songs with Harry Tierny. By October, she was signed to write the lyrics for the film Dixiana.

From 1900 to the mid-1920s, she mostly collaborated with composer Jerome Kern. Her first collaboration with Kern was the musical, She’s a Good Fellow, followed by The Night Boat (1920), and Sally (1920). The Night Boat was one of Caldwell and Kern's more successful shows but is generally not considered revivable today. The plots and comedy of their shows don’t satisfy contemporary audiences. Her final credited work was a radio adaptation of the 1933 film (on which she had also worked) Flying Down to Rio.

Until the careers of Caldwell, along with Rida Johnson Young and Dorothy Donnelly, writing American musical comedy was a male profession. They helped established the idea that a female writer could create works for the stage that were equally as satirical, witty, timely, and simply as comical as the work of any man.

Caldwell married William L. Vinal (1855–1897) on August 2, 1885, in Manhattan, New York.  They had a daughter, Marianna Sarah "Molly" Vinal (1886–1950). William Vinal was killed on March 4, 1897, in a gas explosion in Boston on the Tremont Street Subway at the Boylston station. She remarried lyricist James J. O'Dea (1870–1914) on August 15, 1904, in Brooklyn.

Death
She died in Beverly Hills, California, following a short illness. Her son, Anthony Patrick O'Day (1900–1961), and daughter, Molly O'Day (née Marianna Sarah Vinal; 1886–1950), were with her at the time of her death.

Legacy 
Upon her passing, Variety called her "one of the most prolific librettists known to show business. A quiet, unassuming woman she developed a technique that rarely failed and was both book writer and lyricist." She was inducted into the Songwriters Hall of Fame in 1970.

Shows 

Caldwell wrote lyrics and/or dialogue for dozens of Broadway shows:

 Sergeant Brue (1905)
 The Top o’ th’ World (1907)
 The Nest Egg (1910)
 Uncle Sam (1911)
 The Lady of the Slipper (1912)
 When Claudia Smiles (1914)
 Chin Chin (1914)
 Pom-pom (1916)
 Go to It (1916)
 Jack O’Lantern (1917)
 The Canary (1918)
 She’s a Good Fellow (1919)
 The Lady in Red (1919)
 The Night Boat (1920)
 The Sweetheart Shop (1920)
 Tip Top (1920)
 Hitchy-Koo (1920)
 Good Morning Dearie (1921)
 The Bunch and Judy (1922)
 Sally (1923)
 Stepping Stones (1923)
 Peg-O’-My-Dreams (1924)
 The Magnolia Lady (1924)
 The City Chap (1925)
 Criss Cross (1926)
 Yours Truly (1927)
 Lucky (1927)
 Take the Air (1927)
 Yours Truly (1928)
 Three Cheers (1928)

Notes

References

General

Specific

External links

The lady of the slipper: Musical with book by Caldwell and music by Victor Herbert Vocal score from Sibley Music Library Digital Scores Collection
Anne Caldwell at the Songwriters Hall of Fame

1868 births
1936 deaths
American librettists
American musical theatre lyricists
Writers from Boston
Songwriters from Massachusetts
Women librettists
American women dramatists and playwrights
20th-century American dramatists and playwrights
20th-century American women writers